The 7th Northwest Territories Legislative Council was the 14th assembly of the territorial government. The council lasted from 1970 to 1975 and was the last council to have appointed members.

References

External links
Northwest Territories Legislative Assembly homepage

Northwest Territories Legislative Assemblies